Tarsem is an Indian given name that may refer to
Tarsem Antil (born 1980), Indian film director 
Tarsem Jassar, Punjabi lyricist, singer and producer
Tarsem King, Baron King of West Bromwich (1937–2013), British politician
Tarsem Singh (born 1961), Indian-American film director
Tarsem Singh (field hockey) (1946–2005), Indian field hockey player
Tarsem Singh Purewal (c.1935–1995), Indian editor 

Indian masculine given names